The New York Provincial Congress (1775–1777) was a revolutionary provisional government formed by colonists in 1775, during the American Revolution, as a pro-American alternative to the more conservative New York General Assembly, and as a replacement for the Committee of One Hundred. The Fourth Provincial Congress, resolving itself as the Convention of Representatives of the State of New York, adopted the first Constitution of the State of New York on April 20, 1777.

Background

Committees of correspondence

The Committee of Fifty-one was a committee of correspondence in the City and County of New York that first met on May 16, 1774. On May 30, the Committee formed a subcommittee to write a letter to the supervisors of the counties of New York to extort them to also form similar committees of correspondence, which letter was adopted on a meeting of the Committee on May 31. In response to the letters from Boston, on July 4, 1774 resolutions were approved to appoint five delegates, Isaac Low, John Alsop, James Duane, Philip Livingston, and John Jay, to the "Congress of Deputies from the Colonies" (the First Continental Congress), and request that the other counties also send delegates. Three counties (Westchester, Duchess, and Albany) acquiesced to the five delegates, while three counties (Kings, Suffolk, and Orange) sent delegates of their own. The First Continental Congress met from September 5 to October 26, 1774.

New York General Assembly

In January and February 1775, the New York General Assembly voted down successive resolutions approving the proceedings of the First Continental Congress and refused to send delegates to the Second Continental Congress. New York was the only colonial assembly which did not approve the proceeds of the First Continental Congress. Opposition to the Congress revolved around the opinion that the provincial houses of assembly were the proper agencies to solicit redress for grievances. In March, the Assembly broke with the rest of the colonies and wrote a petition to London, but London rejected the petition because it contained claims about a lack of authority of the "parent state" to tax colonists, "which made it impossible" to accept. The Assembly last met on April 3, 1775.

Provincial Convention (Second Continental Congress)
A Provincial Convention assembled in New York City on April 20, 1775 where delegates were elected to the Second Continental Congress. On March 15, 1775 the Committee of Sixty had issued a call to the counties of New York to send delegates to a Provincial Convention.

Philip Livingston was its chairman. It included the delegates to the first congress and also five new members. All counties other than Tryon, Gloucester, and Cumberland were represented. The scope of the Provincial Convention did not extend beyond electing delegates, and they dispersed on April 22.  On April 23, news of the Battles of Lexington and Concord arrived.

First Provincial Congress
The First Provincial Congress was convened in New York City on May 22, 1775 with Peter Van Brugh Livingston as president. The first resolution adopted was obedience to recommendations made by the Continental Congress.

The congress adapted a "plan of Accommodation between Great Britain and America", which it sent to its delegates to the Continental Congress urging extreme caution in the quarrel with England. The plan demanded the English authorities repeal of all unconstitutional laws affecting the colonies and an acknowledgement of the right of the colonies to self-taxation.  In return New York promised to contribute to the costs of defence, the maintenance of civil government, and to recognize England's right to regulate imperial trade.

In May, they ordered the militia to stockpile arms, undertake the removal of cannon from Fort Crown Point and Fort Ticonderoga, and the erection of fortifications and defences on Manhattan Island. All loyalists in the province were disarmed.  In May, the raising of 3,000 to serve until December 31 was authorized, and in early June they authorized the payment of five pounds sterling for each hundredweight of gunpowder delivered to county stores.

The Congress condemned the planned invasion of Canada, since they had a plan of reconciliation. When in June the British troops in New York City left to board British ships, Marinus Willett intervened to prevent them taking carts loaded with arms back to the ships. The congress welcomed the return of Governor William Tryon. On June 28, 1775 they authorized the raising of the four regiments of the New York Line. On July 20, 1775, members of the Sons of Liberty and others surprised a guard and captured a British storehouse at Turtle Bay. In August, the congress ordered the removal of the cannon at Fort George and while doing so the British HMS Asia opened fire on the militia. In late 1775, the provincial militia was restructured.

It adjourned on November 4, 1775 and appointed a Committee of Safety to sit during its recess. This committee was dominated by Alexander McDougall and John Morin Scott.

Members:

Second Provincial Congress
The Second Provincial Congress was organized on December 6, 1775 and sat in New York City, and continued until adjournment on May 13, 1776. In January, 1776, George Washington ordered Major General Charles Lee to prepare New York City for the coming British attack.  In February, the provincial congress initially refused Lee's entry, but then agreed and also decided to stop provisioning the British ships in New York harbor.

Third Provincial Congress
The Third Provincial Congress was organized on May 22, 1776. It continued in session until June 30, 1776. It took place in Fishkill.  It instructed its delegates to the 2nd Continental Congress to oppose independence.  On May 31, 1776, the Continental Congress recommended that each of the provinces establish themselves as states.   In June, Howe's forces appeared in New York Harbor.

Notable members (partial list):

 Robert Yates
 Jacob Cuyler
 Peter Silvester
 Dirck Swart
 Henry Glen
 Francis Nicoll
 Robert Van Rensselaer
 Abraham Yates Jr.
 Philip Schuyler
 Abraham Ten Broeck
 Walter Livingston

First Constitutional Convention

The Fourth Provincial Congress convened in White Plains on July 9, 1776 and became known as the First Constitutional Convention.  It declared the independent state of New York on July 9, 1776.  On the same day the Declaration of Independence was read by George Washington on the commons of New York City to the Continental Army and local citizens, who celebrated by tearing down the statue of George III in Bowling Green. On July 10, 1776, the Fourth Provincial Congress changed its name to the Convention of Representatives of the State of New York, and "acts as legislature without an executive." On August 1, the convention assigned the task of drafting a constitution to a committee of thirteen and ordered it to report a draft by August 27, but it did not do so until March 12, 1777. While adjourned it left a Committee of Safety in charge.

The Constitution of the State of New York was adopted on April 20, 1777 in Kingston.  The governor would be elected and not appointed, voting qualifications were reduced, secret ballots were introduced, and civil rights were guaranteed. On July 9, 1778 the State of New York signed the Articles of Confederation and officially became part of the government of the United States of America, though it had been a part of the nation as representative were signatories to the Declaration in 1776.

List of presidents and chairmen

1st Provincial Congress

 Peter Van Brugh Livingston May 23, 1775 
 Nathaniel Woodhull Aug 23, 1775 pro tem
 Abraham Yates      Nov 2,  1775 pro tem
      
2nd Provincial Congress

 Nathaniel Woodhull Dec 6,  1775
 John Haring        Dec 16, 1775 pro tem
 Nathaniel Woodhull Feb 12, 1776 pro tem

3rd Provincial Congress

 Nathaniel Woodhull May 18, 1776
 John Haring        Jun 19, 1776

4th Provincial Congress and Representative Convention

 Nathaniel Woodhull Jul  9, 1776
 Abraham Yates      Aug 10, 1776 pro tem
 Abraham Yates      Aug 28, 1776
 Peter Van Brugh Livingston Sep 26, 1776
 Abraham Ten Broeck Mar  6, 1777
 Leonard Gansevoort Apr 18, 1777

Chairmen of the Committee of Safety
Nathaniel Woodhull    July 10, 1776 to August 10, 1776                
Abraham Yates         August 10, 1776 to September 26, 1776             
Peter Van Brugh Livingston  September 26, 1776 to March 6, 1777               
Abraham Ten Broeck    March 6, 1777 to April 9, 1777             
William Smith         April 9, 1777 to April 11, 1777
Pierre Van Cortlandt  April 11, 1777 to April 18, 1777    
Leonard Gansevoort    April 18, 1777 to May 14, 1777

President of the Council of Safety
Pierre Van Cortlandt  May 14, 1777 to July 30, 1777

See also
Provincial Congress
 :Category:Members of the New York Provincial Congress

Footnotes

References
Fernow, Berthold, New York in the Revolution, 1887
 Launitz-Schurer, Leopold, Loyal Whigs and Revolutionaries, The making of the revolution in New York, 1765-1776, 1980, 

New York (state) in the American Revolution
Colonial government in America
New York